The Riddle is the second studio album by English singer-songwriter Nik Kershaw, released on 19 November 1984 by MCA Records.

On release, the album was received favourably by the majority of music critics. It peaked at number eight on the UK Albums Chart and reached the top 10 in New Zealand and Norway. The album spawned three charting singles in the United Kingdom—"The Riddle" peaked at number three on the UK Singles Chart; "Wide Boy" at number nine; "Don Quixote" at number 10. The album has been certified platinum by the British Phonographic Industry (BPI).

The album was re-released on 9 August 2013 on Universal Music Group's Re-presents imprint featuring rare bonus content. The reissue is a two-disc set with the original album digitally remastered from the original 1/2" mix tapes; the bonus content consists of associated B-sides, 12″ mixes, and live versions of the songs featured on the album.

Cover artwork
The album's cover photograph was shot on Chesil Beach in Dorset, England. On the back sleeve of the album, the Isle of Portland is seen in the background. Additionally, the single release of the title song "The Riddle" used the same image of Kershaw on the beach, whilst the back sleeve featured a photograph of Kershaw reading a map, standing at Portland Bill. The Trinity House Obelisk is highlighted in the photograph.

Critical reception
Smash Hits gave the album a mostly positive review calling it "a commendable offering from the thinking man's Limahl". Reviewing retrospectively for AllMusic, critic Scott Bultman wrote that the album "finally garnered some deserved attention. The rest is his unique style of well-crafted synth-pop."

Track listing

US release
The US edition of the album reorders the track listing and replaces "Wouldn't It Be Good" for "City of Angels".

2013 reissue
The track listing of the second disc is:

All of the live tracks were recorded at the Hammersmith Odeon on New Year's Eve 1984.

The website SuperDeluxeEdition noted that the second disc had some notable absences, specifically "Progress (Live)", which was the B-side of "The Riddle", an extended mix of "Wild Horses", which had been on the 12" version of "When a Heart Beats", and the single edits of "Wide Boy" and "Don Quixote". Kershaw defended the omissions, calling "Progress" "a dodgy performance of a mediocre song, badly recorded". Of the "Wild Horses" extended mix, he commented:

He also noted that his choice of material was limited as master copies of certain items had gone missing in the intervening years.

Personnel
Credits are adapted from the album's liner notes.

Musicians
 Nik Kershaw – lead and background vocals; vocal percussion; guitar; bass guitar; keyboards
 Paul "Wix" Wickens – Fairlight CMI programming; Oberheim DMX programming
 Tim Moore – keyboards (and acoustic piano on "So Quiet" (2013 re-release only))
 Andy Richards – keyboards
 Charlie Morgan – drums
 Dennis Smith – bass guitar 
 Stuart Curtis – horns
 Dave Land – horns
 Pandit Dinesh – percussion
 Sheri Kershaw – backing vocals (and lead vocal on "Don't Lie" (2013 re-release only))
 Don Snow – backing vocals
 Mark King – special guest bass guitar on "Easy"

Production team
 Peter Collins – producer
 Julian Mendelsohn – engineer
 Dave Meegan – assistant engineer 
 Greg Fulginiti – mastering

Live personnel (2013 re-release)
 Nik Kershaw – vocals; guitar; keyboards
 Keith Airey – guitar; keyboards; backing vocals
 Tim Moore – keyboards; backing vocals
 Mark Price – drums
 Dennis Smith – bass guitar
 Gary Wallis – percussion

Charts

Weekly charts

Year-end charts

Certifications

References

External links
 

1984 albums
Albums produced by Peter Collins (record producer)
MCA Records albums
Nik Kershaw albums